Florian Chakiachvili (born March 18, 1992) is a French ice hockey defenceman. He is currently playing with the Diables Rouges de Briançon of the French Ligue Magnus.

International
Chakiachvili was named to the France men's national ice hockey team for competition at the 2014 IIHF World Championship.

References

External links

1992 births
Living people
Diables Rouges de Briançon players
French ice hockey defencemen
People from Briançon
French people of Georgian descent
Sportspeople from Hautes-Alpes